Romania elected its members of the European Parliament for the first time on 25 November 2007; the election was initially scheduled for 13 May, but the PM postponed it for domestic political reasons. A referendum on a new voting system for national parliamentary elections was held on the same day.

Pre-election situation
Romania joined the European Union on 1 January 2007, and was initially represented in the European Parliament by 35 observers as follows:

Opinion polls

Results

35 MEPs were appointed by Romania to serve as observers in the Parliament before the country joined in 2007. Since then up until the election, the observers served as full MEPs.

References

See also
 Elections in Romania
 Elections in the European Union
 2007 European Parliament election in Bulgaria
 Romania (European Parliament constituency)

2007 in Romania
2007 elections in Romania
Romania
European Parliament election, 2007 (Romania)
November 2007 events in Europe